Field Trip is an album by Canadian rock band The Grapes of Wrath, released in 2000. The album marked the reunion of Kevin Kane and Tom Hooper as songwriting partners and bandmates for the first time since 1991's These Days, although they were the only two original band members to appear on the album. Session musicians filled in the remaining slots left by departing members Chris Hooper and Vincent Jones, including Pete Bourne on drums and Dave Genn on keyboards.

The album was also packaged with a bonus disc comprising new renditions of several of the band's older songs.  Matt Brain drums on the bonus disc.

A video was released for the song "Black Eye".

After the tour for this album, Hooper and Kane said that they, "...had taken the reunion as far as they could take it" and decided to part ways. The group once again reunited for live dates in 2010, but did not release another album of new material until 2013's High Road.

Track listing

 Black Eye  (Kane)
 Like a Fool  (Hooper/Little)
 18  (Kane)
 Sell the Goat  (Hooper)
 Rivers Flow  (Kane)
 Hitchhiker  (Hooper)
 Dropping the Y  (Kane)
 Head in My Hands  (Hooper)
 Jack's Dilemma  (Kane/Collins/Kravec)
 Begin Communication   (Hooper/Little)
 But Oh Well  (Kane)
 Still Confused  (Hooper)

Bonus Disc ("Extended Field Trip")

This disc was recorded June 12–16, 2000 in Vancouver.  Tracks 1-4 are new acoustic versions of Grapes of Wrath hit singles.  Note that the author credits as listed on this disc differ from the author credits as found on the original recordings.

Tracks 5 and 6 are cover versions of songs by The Monkees and Albert Hammond, respectively.

 Misunderstanding  (Hooper/Kane/Hooper) 
 You May Be Right  (Hooper/Jones/Hooper)
 All the Things I Wasn't  (Kane)
 What Was Going Through My Head   (Hooper/Jones/Hooper)
 Porpoise Song   (Goffin/King)
 Ninety Nine Miles from L.A.   (Hammond)

Personnel 

Produced by: The Grapes of Wrath

Engineer: Lee Preston

Additional Engineering: Ryan Froggett

Mix Engineer: Dave "Rave" Ogilvie

2000 albums
The Grapes of Wrath (band) albums
Nettwerk Records albums